The Act of Marriage: The Beauty of Sexual Love is a self-help book, written by Christian writers Tim LaHaye and Beverly LaHaye.

Summary
The Act of Marriage explains the sexual satisfaction for Christian married couples. It is based on several books of the Bible, notably the Song of Songs. Indeed, the book is noteworthy for opening up dialogue among Christians about their sexuality —especially female sexuality and sexual satisfaction. It discusses  birth control and concepts of sexology.

Reception 
In 2016, 2.5 million copies of the book were sold.

Criticism
Rolling Stone magazine criticized the book as "an explicit Christian sex manual, condemning petting, abortion and homosexuality." However, many Christian groups hail the book as a milestone in contemporary Christian sex education.

Academic study

Within academia, The Act of Marriage is viewed as an interesting insight into the ever changing relationship between mainstream religion and sexual practice. Michigan State Professor, Amy DeRogatis, took a deep look at this book and others of the sort to explore the impacts they have on gender roles within Protestant Evangelical tradition. While it pushes the boundaries of accepted sexual practice within Evangelical heterosexual marriage to that point, it upholds a strictly complementarian view of gender. At some points within the text it describes men as "beasts" and "uncontrollable" in the context of sexual desire, while it paints women as pleasers and far less sexual than their husbands. Although this seems overly traditionalist, they were not out of line with commonly held cultural belief.

References

External links 
 The Act of Marriage at the publisher's website
 Interview with Beverly LaHaye

1976 non-fiction books
Evangelical Christian literature
Books about marriage
Self-help books
Sex manuals
Zondervan books